José Joaquín Bautista Arias (born July 25, 1964) is a Dominican-born former right-handed pitcher who played in Major League Baseball (MLB) from 1988 to 1997.

Early and personal life
Bautista was born in Baní, in the Dominican Republic. He is observantly Jewish, born to a Dominican father and an Israeli mother. His mother's family was originally from Russia, as is his wife.

Baseball career
Bautista was signed by the New York Mets as an amateur free agent in April 1981. In 1984 he was 13–4 with a 3.13 earned run average (ERA) for Columbia in the South Atlantic League, and in 1985, 15–8 with a 2.34 ERA for Lynchburg in the Carolina League.

He pitched for seven years in the New York Mets system before being selected by the Baltimore Orioles in the December 1987 Rule 5 draft.  He joined the Orioles rotation in 1988, spending four years with them before moving to the Chicago Cubs (1993–94), San Francisco Giants (1995–96), Detroit Tigers (1997), and St. Louis Cardinals (1997).

As a rookie, he went 6–15 with 76 strikeouts and a 4.30 ERA in 171 innings pitched, including 25 starts and three complete games.  That was his best season as an Oriole.
He holds the MLB record for fewest pitches in a complete game of 8 innings or more. He threw 70 pitches in a 1-0 Orioles loss to the Seattle Mariners on September 30, 1988.

He resurfaced as a relief pitcher with the Cubs in 1993, going 10–3 with a 2.82 ERA and 111 innings in 58 appearances (7 as a starter).  He kept batters to a .193 batting average in games that were late and close.  That was his best Major League season.

After going 4–5 for Chicago in 1994 while pitching in 58 games (second in the league), he pitched with San Francisco the next two years and spent 1997 with Detroit and St. Louis in his last Major League season. 
 
In a nine-season career, Bautista posted a 32–42 record with 328 strikeouts and a 4.04 ERA in 312 games, including three saves, 49 starts, 4 complete games and 685 innings pitched.

Through 2010, he was fifth all-time in career games pitched (312; directly behind Steve Stone) among Jewish major league baseball players.

Coaching career
Bautista was the pitching coach of the Burlington Bees in 2001–02, the Idaho Falls Chukars in 2004–06 and the Burlington Royals in 2007.  He also managed the Great Falls Voyagers, advanced A rookie team of the Chicago White Sox, was a roving instructor for Latin players in the White Sox farm system in 2010.  Since 2011, he has served as the pitching coach for the Kannapolis Intimidators, an A-ball affiliate of the White Sox.

See also
Players from Dominican Republic in MLB
List of select Jewish baseball players

References

External links

Jose Bautista at SABR (Baseball Biography Project)
Jose Bautista at Baseball Almanac
Jose Bautista at Baseball Biography
Jose Bautista at Pura Pelota
 "Minor League's top Jewish prospects", 5/10/06

1964 births
Living people
Águilas Cibaeñas players
Baltimore Orioles players
Calgary Cannons players
Columbia Mets players
Chicago Cubs players
Detroit Tigers players
Dominican Republic expatriate baseball players in Canada
Dominican Republic expatriate baseball players in the United States
Dominican Republic people of Spanish descent
Dominican Republic people of Jewish descent
Dominican Republic Jews
Dominican Republic people of Israeli descent
Dominican Republic people of Russian descent
Gulf Coast Mets players
Jackson Mets players
Jewish Major League Baseball players
Kingsport Mets players
Louisville Redbirds players
Lynchburg Mets players
Major League Baseball pitchers
Major League Baseball players from the Dominican Republic
Memphis Chicks players
Miami Miracle players
Minor league baseball coaches
Norfolk Tides players
Norwich Navigators players
Oklahoma City 89ers players
Omaha Royals players
Ottawa Lynx players
People from Baní
Phoenix Firebirds players
Rochester Red Wings players
San Francisco Giants players
St. Louis Cardinals players